Gaston Isidore Allard (14 April 1838 – 5 January 1918) was a French botanist, entomologist, and founder of The Arboretum Gaston Allard.

Biography 
Allard was born on 14 April 1838. After attending high school, Allard studied under Alexandre Boreau, the director of the jardin des plantes d'Angers.

In 1863, Allard became a member of the Société entomologique de France and voyaged to Algeria, Spain, and Portugal to study Lepidoptera and the regional flora. In 1867, he described the species Kretania martini in Algeria.

After the death of his father, he inherited the family estate and developed the gardens. In 1875, he began to collect oak and conifer trees. He received support from local plant nurseries, and he received seeds and plants from all over the world. By 1907, his arboretum contained 2,000 species, including 250 conifers, 125 oaks, and 1,500 shrubs.

From 1892 to 1918, Allard served as a member of the city council of Angers. In 1916, Allard donated his arboretum to the Pasteur Institute. He remained as director.

Allard died on 5 January 1918 in Angers. The botanist Louis Blaringhem, his colleague from the Pasteur Institute, succeeded Allard as arboretum director. His property later became the Muséum des sciences naturelles d'Angers.

References 

French entomologists
French naturalists
20th-century French botanists
19th-century French botanists
1838 births
1918 deaths